Ian McGuinness Harty (born 8 April 1978 in Bellshill) is a Scottish footballer. He played for a wide number of lower Scottish Football League teams during his career. His longest spell was with one club was with Stranraer allowing him to notch his highest goals tally with one club. He also transferred from Airdrie United down south of the border to join English side Darlington, however he only made two substitute appearances during his five months in England.

See also
2004–05 Clyde F.C. season

References

External links

 (pre-summer 2008)
 (summer 2008–present)

Scottish footballers
1978 births
Living people
Heart of Midlothian F.C. players
Albion Rovers F.C. players
Stranraer F.C. players
Clyde F.C. players
Hamilton Academical F.C. players
Raith Rovers F.C. players
Stirling Albion F.C. players
Airdrieonians F.C. players
Darlington F.C. players
Stenhousemuir F.C. players
Brechin City F.C. players
Forfar Athletic F.C. players
Scottish Football League players
English Football League players
Footballers from Bellshill
Annan Athletic F.C. players
Association football forwards